Georgia Institute of Technology has graduated a number of athletes.  This includes graduates, non-graduate former students and current students of Georgia Tech who are notable for their achievements within athletics, sometimes before or after their time at Georgia Tech. Other alumni can be found in the list of Georgia Institute of Technology alumni; notable administration, faculty, and staff can be found on the list of Georgia Institute of Technology faculty. Intercollegiate sports teams at Georgia Tech are called "Yellow Jackets", and are run by the Georgia Tech Athletic Association. The Athletic Association runs Georgia Tech's Hall of Fame, which has inducted many of Tech's greatest players throughout the program's history.

Despite their technical backgrounds and courses of study, many Georgia Tech students participate in college athletics, outdoor activities and other forms of sport. Georgia Tech offers seventeen varsity sports: Men's Football, Men's and Women's Basketball, Men's Baseball, Women's Softball, Women's Volleyball, Men's Golf, Men's and Women's Tennis, Men's and Women's Swimming and Diving, Men's and Women's Track and Field, and Men's and Women's Cross Country. Approximately 150 Tech students have gone into the National Football League (NFL), with many others going into the National Basketball Association (NBA) or Major League Baseball (MLB). Some Tech players have also participated in the Olympic Games.

Well-known American football athletes include former students Calvin Johnson, Ken Whisenhunt, and Keith Brooking, former Tech head football coaches John Heisman, and Bobby Dodd, and all-time greats such as Joe Hamilton, Pat Swilling, Billy Shaw, and Joe Guyon. Tech's entrants into the NBA include Dennis Scott, Mark Price, John Salley, Stephon Marbury, and Chris Bosh. Award-winning baseball stars include Mark Teixeira, Nomar Garciaparra, and Jason Varitek. In golf, Bobby Jones founded The Masters, David Duval was ranked number 1 in the world in 2001, and Stewart Cink won the 2009 British Open.

Olympics

American football

Basketball

 

 

Alade Aminu (born 1987), Nigerian-American basketball player, 2015–16 Israel Basketball Premier League rebounding leader
 James Banks III (born 1998), basketball player
 Robert Carter (born 1994), basketball player in the Israeli Basketball Premier League
Adam Smith (born 1992), basketball player for Hapoel Holon in the Israel Basketball Premier League

Baseball

Golf

Tennis

Track and field

Other athletics

See also

 Atlantic Coast Conference
 Buzz (mascot)
 "Ramblin' Wreck from Georgia Tech"

References

External links
 Official Georgia Tech athletics site

Lists of people by university or college in Georgia (U.S. state)
Athletes
Lists of American sportspeople